Alf Smith was a footballer who made 20 appearances for Port Vale from 1913 to 1918.

Career
Smith played for Hamilton Academicals, before joining Port Vale in December 1913. He played in the FA Cup first round clash at Bolton Wanderers on 10 January 1914, which was lost 3–0. He enjoyed regular football until his conscription in the summer of 1914. After two years of fighting he was seriously wounded, but by the time he returned to Burslem in September 1918 he was fit enough to play, which 'caused him so much pleasure'. However, he developed complications from his wound in November 1918 and was unable to play again.

Career statistics
Source:

References

Year of birth missing
Year of death missing
English footballers
Association football wing halves
Association football inside forwards
Hamilton Academical F.C. players
Port Vale F.C. players
British Army personnel of World War I